Juan Carlos Gené (6 November 1929 – 31 January 2012) was an Argentine actor and playwright. He was president and secretary general of the Argentine Actors Association, managing director of Canal Siete and managing director of Teatro General San Martín.

Gené narrated films like Revolución: El cruce de los Andes and wrote La Raulito. He also acted in the movies like Don Segundo Sombra and Coup de Grâce. He died in 2012.

References

External links
 

1929 births
2012 deaths
Argentine male actors
Argentine theatre directors
Argentine dramatists and playwrights
Argentine screenwriters
Male screenwriters
Burials at La Chacarita Cemetery
Male dramatists and playwrights
20th-century dramatists and playwrights
20th-century Argentine male writers